Como Farm is a small settlement in Kenya's Central Province.

See also 
 Ruiru
 Gichuru

References 

Populated places in Central Province (Kenya)